Chewy may refer to:

 Chewy (company), pet food company based in the United States
 Chewy: Esc from F5, a 1996 computer game and its title character
 Andrew Lichtenberger (born 1987), American poker player
 Daniel Mongrain (born 1976), member of the Canadian band Martyr
 Luis Suárez, Uruguayan association footballer 
 Chewy the puppy, a character from the animation series Foster's Home for Imaginary Friends
 Chewbacca, a fictional character, whose name is often shortened to "Chewy" or "Chewie"
 An Australian abbreviation for chewing gum
 A wine tasting descriptor
 Chewy bar, a brand name granola bar made by the Quaker Oats Company

See also
 "Chewy Chewy", a song by Ohio Express
 Chewiness, used to describe any foodstuff that requires a lot of chewing
 Chuy (disambiguation)